Mansinghapur is a census town in Jagatballavpur CD Block of Howrah Sadar subdivision in Howrah district in the Indian state of West Bengal. It is close to Bargachia.

History
The town is said to have been named after the Mughal general Raja Man Singh as he is believed to have set up camp here on the banks of the Gouriganga River, while on his way to Orissa on a military expedition.

Geography

Demographics
As per 2011 Census of India Mansinghapur had a total population of 6,004 of which 3,109 (52%) were males and 2,895 (48%) were females. Population below 6 years was 588. The total number of literates in Mansinghapur was 4,828 (89.14% of the population over 6 years).

 India census, Mansinghapur had a population of 5401. Males constitute 52% of the population and females 48%. Mansinghapur has an average literacy rate of 76%, higher than the national average of 59.5%: male literacy is 81% and female literacy is 70%. In Mansinghapur, 11% of the population is under 6 years of age.

Culture
There are two Mosque and three old Temple in this town: Dharmathakur temple in Panditpara built in 1812, Radhakantajiu temple, Raghunathjiu temple. None of the temples presently have any terracotta carvings.

Transport
Amta Road (part of State Highway 15) is the artery of the town.

Bus

Private Bus
 9A Bargachia - Haripal railway station
 E44 Rampur - Howrah Station

Mini Bus
 34 Purash - Howrah Station
 35 Hantal - Howrah Station

CTC Bus
 C11/1 Munsirhat - Howrah Station

Bus Routes Without Numbers
 Bargachia - Sealdah Station (Barafkal)
 Bargachia - Tarakeswar
 Pancharul - Howrah Station
 Udaynarayanpur - Howrah Station
 Rajbalhat - Howrah Station
 Tarakeswar - Howrah Station

Train
Bargachia railway station on Howra-Amta line under Kharagpur railway division of South Eastern railway zone, is the nearest railway station.

References

Cities and towns in Howrah district